Mael Lambong  is Malaysian action comedy filmthat aired on June 21, 2012 in Malaysia.

Cast
 Zizan Razak as Mael Lambong
 Juliana Evans as Maria
 Taiyuddin Bakar as Mat Tiger
 Shenthy Feliziana as Rozie
 Shuaib Sepahtu as agent
 Sabri Yunus as the Chief Agent

External links 
 

Malaysian action films
Films directed by Ahmad Idham